Leiden Lammenschans is a railway station in Leiden, Netherlands. The station, designed by Koen van der Gaast, was opened on 18 May 1961. It is served by trains running between Leiden Centraal and Utrecht Centraal, and by RijnGouweLijn trains running between Leiden Centraal and Gouda at peak hours.

Leiden Lammenschans was named after the nearby fortification Schans Lammen, the encampment of the Spanish troops during the Siege of Leiden in 1573 and 1574.

Train services
The following services call at Leiden Lammenschans:
2x per hour intercity service Leiden - Alphen aan den Rijn - Utrecht
2x per hour local service (sprinter) Leiden - Alphen aan den Rijn - Gouda (peak hours only)

External links
NS website 
Dutch Public Transport journey planner 

Railway stations in South Holland
Railway stations opened in 1961
Buildings and structures in Leiden